The Commonwealth Ministerial Action Group on the Harare Declaration, abbreviated to CMAG, is a group of representatives of members of the Commonwealth of Nations that is responsible for upholding the Harare Declaration.  That Declaration dictates the Commonwealth's fundamental political values, and sets the core membership criteria of the organisation.  Its remit to evaluate the Harare Declaration lapses every two years; the remit must be renewed and its membership reviewed by the biennial Commonwealth Heads of Government Meeting.

CMAG was established in November 1995 at Millbrook Resort, in Queenstown, New Zealand, as a result of the Millbrook Commonwealth Action Programme, to punish serious or persistent violations of the Harare Declaration.  It is composed of the Foreign Ministers (or equivalent) of eight Commonwealth member states, which may be augmented by either one or two further representatives of a region or interest involved in a particular case.  There have been twenty-seven ordinary meetings, two special meetings, and one extraordinary meeting, called unevenly over the past twelve years.  For logistical reasons, 29 of the 30 meetings have been held in either London (headquarters of the Commonwealth) or New York City (headquarters of the United Nations).

History
In its first meeting, CMAG decided that its initial focus would be upon the three (then-)military dictatorships of The Gambia, Nigeria, and Sierra Leone, and approved of the Commonwealth's suspension of Nigeria from the organisation earlier in the year.  These three countries would form the mainstay of the work of CMAG, and form the whole of its reports, until the 1999 coup d'état in Pakistan necessitated it to vote unanimously to suspend Pakistan from the Commonwealth.  Nigeria's reintegration was deemed complete by 1999, when its suspension was lifted; indeed, it was chosen to be a member of CMAG prior to the thirteenth meeting.

In 2000, the situations in Fiji and the Solomon Islands were put under permanent scrutiny, as was that in Zimbabwe in 2001.  Gambia was taken off the group's formal agenda at the seventeenth meeting.  Due to its acrimonious withdrawal from the Commonwealth in 2003, the issue of Zimbabwe, which had dominated the affairs of the Commonwealth since 2001, became moot and was not discussed from 2004 onwards, while Fiji was taken off the agenda due to encouraging progress in that country's political progress.

At its twenty-fourth meeting, in September 2004, it was decided that (at least in principle) CMAG should meet once a year, and preferably in New York.  An extraordinary meeting was called for the 8 December 2006 in light of the 2006 coup d'état, at which it was decided to suspend Fiji's membership of the Commonwealth.  

On 12 November 2007, the Commonwealth gave Pakistan a 10-day deadline to restore its constitution and lift other emergency measures or face suspension. By 22 November 2007, the CMAG voted to suspend Pakistan from Commonwealth Membership.

Membership
Since 2003, the group has included the eight members, plus a representative of the Commonwealth Chairperson-in-Office's country.  These have been, successively, Nigeria, Malta, Uganda, and Trinidad and Tobago.

Footnotes

External links
 Commonwealth Ministerial Action Group official website

Ministerial Action Group
Organizations established in 1995